Wheelchair rugby at the 2012 Summer Paralympics was held in the Basketball Arena, London from 5 September to 9 September. There was one event where 8 teams competed. Though a mixed gender event the vast majority of competitors at the games were male.

Qualification
A NPC may enter one team. The host country directly qualified, as it had a rank on the IWRF Wheelchair Rugby World Ranking List on 31 January 2012. Two qualification spots went to the top two NPCs on the ranking list that were not otherwise qualified.

Tournament

The tournament took place from 5 to 9 September at the Basketball Arena in Olympic Park. It consisted of an initial round-robin group stage of two groups of four teams, followed by a fifth to eighth place playoff round for the bottom two from each group. The top two teams from each group went through to the semifinals and gold and bronze-medal matches.

Group stage

Group A

Group B

Playoffs

5-8th-place semifinals

Seventh-place match

Fifth-place match

Medal round
Bracket

Semifinals

Bronze-medal match

Gold-medal match

Ranking

Medalists

See also
Wheelchair rugby at the 2012 Summer Paralympics – Rosters

References

External links

 International Wheelchair Rugby Federation (IWRF)
 
 

 
2012
wheelchair rugby
Paralympics